Albert M. Skeels (February 27, 1813January 6, 1876) was an American businessman and politician.  He was the 9th mayor of Ripon, Wisconsin, and served two terms in the Wisconsin State Assembly, representing Fond du Lac County.

Biography

Born in Swanton, Vermont, he moved to Ripon, Wisconsin in 1853 and was a merchant. He served as postmaster of Ripon, Wisconsin and was president of the Ripon Agricultural Society. He also served as trustee of the Insane Asylum. In 1866, Skeels served as mayor of Ripon, Wisconsin. Then, in 1866 and 1867, Skeels served in the Wisconsin State Assembly and was a Republican. He suffered a stroke in Ripon in January 1876, and died a few days later.

References

External links
The Mayor's Page: Ripon-History

1813 births
1876 deaths
People from Swanton (town), Vermont
People from Ripon, Wisconsin
Businesspeople from Wisconsin
Mayors of places in Wisconsin
Republican Party members of the Wisconsin State Assembly
19th-century American politicians
19th-century American businesspeople